Oleg Vladimirovich Kvasha (born July 26, 1978) is a Russian former professional ice hockey forward who played in the National Hockey League (NHL) with the Florida Panthers, New York Islanders and the Phoenix Coyotes.

Oleg was renowned for his blonde flowing locks fluttering from under his helmet as he sped up and down the ice

Playing career
As a youth, Kvasha played in the 1992 Quebec International Pee-Wee Hockey Tournament with a team from Moscow.

Kvasha was chosen in the third round, 65th overall, by the Florida Panthers in the 1996 NHL Entry Draft. He made his NHL debut with the Panthers in the 1998–99 season, appearing in 68 games as a rookie for 12 goals and 25 points.

After completing his second season with the Panthers, on June 24, 2000, Kvasha was dealt by Florida to the New York Islanders with winger Mark Parrish for goaltender Roberto Luongo and center Olli Jokinen.

After playing with the Islanders for five seasons, Kvasha was traded during the 2005–06 campaign, along with a conditional fifth round draft pick to the Phoenix Coyotes for a third round pick in the 2006 NHL Entry Draft on March 9, 2006.

Following his seventh season in the NHL, split between the Islanders and Coyotes, Kvasha ended his North American career in returning to his native Russia, agreeing to terms with HC Vityaz of the then Russian Superleague.

Kvasha played a further 9 years in the Kontinental Hockey League, appearing with Traktor Chelyabinsk, Atlant Moscow Oblast, Metallurg Magnitogorsk, HC Neftekhimik Nizhnekamsk, CSKA Moscow, Avangard Omsk, HC Spartak Moscow and Barys Astana before retiring after his 20th professional season in 2014–15.

International play
Kvasha has represented his native Russia in the 2002 Winter Olympics in Salt Lake City, Utah, where he won a bronze medal.

Career statistics

Regular season and playoffs

International

References

External links

1978 births
Living people
Atlant Moscow Oblast players
Avangard Omsk players
Barys Nur-Sultan players
Beast of New Haven players
HC CSKA Moscow players
Florida Panthers draft picks
Florida Panthers players
Ice hockey players at the 2002 Winter Olympics
Medalists at the 2002 Winter Olympics
Metallurg Magnitogorsk players
HC Neftekhimik Nizhnekamsk players
New York Islanders players
Olympic bronze medalists for Russia
Olympic ice hockey players of Russia
Olympic medalists in ice hockey
Phoenix Coyotes players
Russian ice hockey centres
Severstal Cherepovets players
HC Spartak Moscow players
Ice hockey people from Moscow
Traktor Chelyabinsk players
HC Vityaz players
Russian expatriate ice hockey people
Russian expatriate sportspeople in the United States
Russian expatriate sportspeople in Kazakhstan
Expatriate ice hockey players in the United States
Expatriate ice hockey players in Kazakhstan